In enzymology, a serine O-acetyltransferase is an enzyme that catalyzes the chemical reaction

acetyl-CoA + L-serine  CoA + O-acetyl-L-serine

Thus, the two substrates of this enzyme are acetyl-CoA and L-serine, whereas its two products are CoA and O-acetyl-L-serine.

This enzyme belongs to the family of transferases, specifically those acyltransferases transferring groups other than aminoacyl groups.  The systematic name of this enzyme class is acetyl-CoA:L-serine O-acetyltransferase. Other names in common use include SATase, L-serine acetyltransferase, serine acetyltransferase, and serine transacetylase.  This enzyme participates in cysteine metabolism and sulfur metabolism.

Structural studies

N terminal protein domain

In molecular biology, the protein domain  SATase is short for Serine acetyltransferase and refers to an enzyme that catalyses the conversion of L-serine to L-cysteine in E. coli. More specifically, its role is to catalyse the activation of L-serine by acetyl-CoA.This entry refers to the N-terminus of the protein which has a sequence that is conserved in plants and bacteria.

Importance of function
The N-terminal domain of the protein Serine acetyltransferase helps catalyse acetyl transfer.  This particular enzyme catalyses serine into cysteine which is eventually converted to the essential amino acid methionine. Of particular interest to scientists, is the ability to harness the natural ability of the enzyme, Serine acetyltransferase, to create nutritionally essential amino acids and to exploit this ability through transgenic plants. These transgenic plants would contain more essential sulphur amino acids meaning a healthier diet for humans and animals.

Structure
The  amino-terminal alpha-helical domain particularly the amino acid residues  His158 (histidine in position 158) and Asp143 (aspartic acid in position 143) form a catalytic triad with the substrate for acetyl transfer. There are eight alpha helices that form the N-terminal domain.

References

 
 

EC 2.3.1
Enzymes of known structure